"House of Memories" is a song by American rock solo project Panic! at the Disco. It was released on January 15, 2016, as the tenth track on the band's fifth studio album, Death of a Bachelor (2016). The song gained popularity in April 2022, causing it to chart in multiple countries, including Austria, Germany, the Netherlands, Norway, Portugal, Sweden and Switzerland.

On October 28, 2022, following the song's success earlier that year on TikTok, the song was released on an EP along with slowed down and sped up versions.

Critical reception
Upon release in 2016, the song received mixed reviews from critics. Nate Chinen at New York Times called it a song "about being lonely while in love", "with an intriguing frisson". Sputnikmusic'''s Ben Kupiszewski included the track in his recommended tracks of the album. However, Lisa Henderson of Clash'' thought the song was "misplaced", causing the album to end "on a slightly underwhelming note".

Charts

Weekly charts

Year-end charts

Certifications

References

2016 songs
Panic! at the Disco songs
Songs written by Brendon Urie
Songs written by Jake Sinclair (musician)
Songs written by Morgan Kibby